Lazër Mjeda (1869–1935) was an Albanian prelate of the Roman Catholic Church, and a member of the Mjeda family.

Biography
Lazër (Llazar) Mjeda was born in Shkodër, Ottoman Empire — present-day Albania — on March 6, 1869. From 1900 to 1904 he was the Bishop of the Roman Catholic Diocese of Sapë, while from 1905 to 1909 he was the Archbishop of the Roman Catholic Diocese of Shkodër. During this time, the Catholic Church also made him the Titular Archbishop for the Diocese of Areopolis. From mid 1909 till late 1921, Mjeda was the Archbishop of the Diocese of Skopje.

From 1921 he was the Archbishop of the Roman Catholic Archdiocese of Shkodër-Pult.

Mjeda was member of the literary society Society for the Unity of the Albanian Language (Bashkimi i Shkodrës), creator of Bashkimi alphabet, one of the main Albanian alphabets discussed in the Congress of Monastir of 1908.

See also

References

Sources
Albert Ramaj: LAZËR MJEDA NË ARGJIPESHKVINË SHKUP-PRIZREN MES 1909-1921 (Sipas arkivit Austriak, emërimi tij, laramanizmi, largimi nga Prizreni) (S. 47-172) in: IMZOT LAZËR MJEDA- Mbrojtës dhe lëvrues i identitetit shqiptar, St. Gallen 2011

1869 births
1935 deaths
Bishops of Skopje
20th-century Roman Catholic archbishops in Albania
19th-century Albanian Roman Catholic priests
Lazër
People from Shkodër
People from Scutari vilayet
Activists of the Albanian National Awakening